Laura Mullen (born 1958 in Los Angeles), is a contemporary American poet working in hybrid genres and traditions.

Life and work 
Mullen received her BA in English from UC Berkeley and her MFA in Poetry from the University of Iowa Writers' Workshop before going to teach at, among other places, Colorado State University, where her courses included seminars on Modernism, Postmodernism, and Cross-Genre Writing. She’s also been invited as a guest author to teach at Naropa University's Summer Writing Program (1996, 2000, 2002, 2005, 2008), Columbia College – Chicago - (spring semester 2003), Brown University (2001), and the University of Iowa Writers' Workshop Summer Program, (1998). She was awarded a National Endowment for the Arts Fellowship, 1988 and has since received numerous other fellowships in the United States and abroad.

She is currently on the permanent faculty at Louisiana State University, teaching literature, creative writing, and film.

Publications and Literary awards

Books
Enduring Freedom: A Little Book of Mechanical Brides,  Otis Books / Seismicity Editions, 2012
Dark Archive  University of California Press, New California Poetry Series, 2011
Murmur, (Futurepoem Books , New York City, 2007) 
Subject  University of California Press, New California Poetry Series, 2005—A song cycle by composer Jason Eckardt based on the final poem in Subject was released on Mode records in 2011
After I Was Dead (University of Georgia Press, Athens, GA, 1999) 
The Tales of Horror,  (Kelsey Stn Press, CA, 1999) 
The Surface (University of Iowa Press, 1991)--National Poetry Series selection

Anthologized works
Poems for Hybrid: A Norton Anthology of Contemporary Poetry, edited by Cole Swensen and David St John, W.W. Norton & Company, 2008) 
Prose: "Torch Song" in Civil Disobediences: Poetics and Politics in Action (Coffee House Press, 2004). 
Poems in The Book of Irish American Poetry (University of Notre Dame Press) 
Prose in Paraspheres (Omnidawn Press). 
Artist's statement and seven poems in The Iowa Anthology of New American Poetries (University of IA Press, 2004) 
Poems: "House,” “For the Reader (Blank Book),” “Self-Portrait as Somebody Else,” and “After I Was Dead” in The Extraordinary Tide (2001) 
“Museum Garden Cafe” collected in Night Out (1997) 
Prose: “His Father” in Chick-Lit: Post-Feminist Fiction (1995) 
“They,” in The Best American Poetry 1990 edited by David Lehman and Jorie Graham (Scribner’s, 1990).

Periodicals
Poems, Prose and Poetry Reviews have appeared in numerous print and online periodicals such as Bomb , Denver Quarterly, Ping Pong, Lingo , Fence, Xantippe, Aufgabe, New American Writing, Ploughshares–including also articles on her work, etc.--, Mipoesias, How2, Talisman, Cranky, on poets.org, BookForum, and in the Iowa Review.
See also a Hypertext piece by Laura Mullen on the AltX site: AltX.com

Grants, fellowships, literary awards & prizes
Louisiana Board of Regents ATLAS grant;
Manship Summer Research Fellowship (Louisiana State University) 2005; 
MacDowell Colony Fellow: 2003, 1996, 1994, 1991, 1988; 
Professional Development Grant for travel to France (2003); 
Professional Development Grant for Travel to the Valparaíso Foundation in Spain (Mojacar, Spain), 1998; 
Career Enhancement Grant, 1998; 
Professional Development Program Fund Award, 1997; 
Rona Jaffe Foundation Writers' Award, 1996; 
Max Orovitz Fellowship (University of Miami) 1993; 
National Endowment for the Arts Fellowship, 1988; 
Karolyi Foundation Fellowship: 1989, 1988, 1987. 
Linda Hull Memorial Prize, The Denver Quarterly (for “The Selected Letters”), 1996; 
National Poetry Series winner (for The Surface), 1990; 
Denver Quarterly Prize, 1986; 
Eisner Prize (University of California, Berkeley), 1984; 
Chauncy Wetmore Wells Prize (U.C. Berkeley), 1984; 
Stanford Prize, Ironwood Review, 1983.

External links
Homesite with selected works and an interview about Murmur:  

1958 births
Living people
American women poets
Rona Jaffe Foundation Writers' Award winners
21st-century American women